Sansan Chien (1 July 1967 – 24 October 2011) was a composer of contemporary classical music. Chien was well known in Taiwan for her teaching of music theory and composition.

Life and career
She was born 1 July 1967 in Changhua, Taiwan, and grew up in the Taichung area. When she was fifteen, her family moved to the United States, settling in Sylvania, Ohio where she completed her high school education. She then earned a bachelor of music degree in piano performance from The University of Toledo Department of Music (1989), a master's degree in music composition from the Ohio University School of Music (1991), and a doctor of music degree in music composition from the Jacobs School of Music at Indiana University Bloomington (1997). During the time of her studies at Indiana University she became a naturalized US citizen, but opted to retain her ROC (Taiwan) citizenship as well.

Dr. Chien was a full-time assistant professor of music theory and composition at the National Kaohsiung Normal University Department of Music from 1997 to 2011.  Previously, she was a part-time instructor of music composition at The University of Indianapolis and an associate instructor of music composition and related courses at Indiana University Jacobs School of Music. She was much appreciated by the many students she taught, especially those at National Kaohsiung Normal University. She was also instrumental in helping to organize the music curriculum at NKNU and dramatically improved the level of music theory and music composition instruction there. Together with her husband, Paul San Gregory, a composer and professor of music, they created an intense and encouraging learning environment that has benefited many NKNU graduates. For many years they also created and directed the Contemporary Chamber Ensemble at NKNU, which was the only university-run new music ensemble in Taiwan at the time.

Death
Sansan Chien died at the age of 44 on Monday, Oct. 24, 2011, in Chang Geng Memorial Hospital, Kaohsiung, Taiwan, following a difficult struggle with cancer.

References

1967 births
2011 deaths
Taiwanese composers
People from Changhua County
Ohio University alumni
University of Toledo alumni
Indiana University faculty
University of Indianapolis faculty
Jacobs School of Music alumni
Taiwanese emigrants to the United States
Naturalized citizens of the United States
American women classical composers
American classical composers
American women academics
21st-century American women